The men's super-G at the 2011 Asian Winter Games was held on 1 February 2011 at Shymbulak Alpine Sport Resort in Almaty, Kazakhstan.

Schedule
All times are Almaty Time (UTC+06:00)

Results
Legend
DNF — Did not finish
DNS — Did not start
DSQ — Disqualified

References

Results

External links
 Official website

Men Super-G